The Mixing It Session is an EP by Disco Inferno. It was released in 1999 on Tugboat Records in the United Kingdom. A six-song single taken from a BBC Radio 3 session recorded in 1994, it was released many years after Disco Inferno had disbanded.

Critical reception
AllMusic wrote: "'Bird' begins innocently enough as a standard issue ambient instrumental, but by the end you find yourself at a pool party, listening to Caribbean music while submerged in the deep end. The closing 'Rats' sounds most like old Disco Inferno, thanks to Ian Crause's Vini Reilly-like guitar spirals."

Track listing

Personnel
Ian Crause – vocals, guitar, samples
Paul Wilmott – bass
Rob Whatley – drums
Philip Tagney – producer

References

Disco Inferno (band) albums
1999 EPs